The following is a list of diseases of sweetgum (Liquidambar spp.).

Bacterial diseases

Fungal diseases

Miscellaneous diseases and disorders

Nematodes, parasitic

References
General references
Common Names of Diseases from the American Phytopathological Society
Specific citations

Liquidambar
Sweetgum
Tree diseases